The Mayor of Monmouth is an elected position given to a town councillor in Monmouth in Wales. The position dates back about 750 years.

History
The position of Mayor in Monmouth was established in the thirteenth century by the people who were controlling the town's market. A seal was obtained from King Henry III confirming the rights and privileges of the position and the right to also establish bailiffs for the town. The position was confirmed in 1447 when Henry VI granted a charter to the town which permitted the town to raise taxes to pay for the town and also gave some freedom from the King's taxes. (Henry VI's father had been born in the town.) This charter confirmed the position of mayor as an annual elected position and agreed that two maces should be carried before the elected person. These maces survive and carry the arms of the Duchy of Lancaster.

An elected mayor and bailiffs came to lead this body and by the middle of the thirteenth century a seal had been acquired from King Henry III with certain privileges. The office of mayor can be dated from this time.

John Speed mentions the position again in 1611 when he itemises the authorities as a mayor, two bailiffs and fifteen councillors. This list is still true in 2012.

In 1813 that was a court case concerning the over the influence of the Duke of Beaufort in the appointment of Mayors of Monmouth. The case was won by a team including local historian, Charles Heath but the Duke found other ways of gaming the system. Heath eventually became Mayor in 1819 and 1821.

In 1835 the Municipal Corporations Act adjusted the powers but identified 1666 as the defining date of Monmouth's last charter.

William Sambrook who was a local chemist and a keen supporter of Monmouth Baptist Church was elected Mayor of Monmouth nine times.

List of mayors (incomplete)
 1675 – Richard Ballard
 1744 – William Williams
 1785 – William Cecel
 1786 – Luke Phillips
 1787 – Thomas Morrison?
 1806 – Thomas Prosser 
 1819 – Charles Heath
 1820 – Rev. Thomas Prosser
 1821 – Charles Heath
 1822 – Hezekiah Swift
 1836 – Thomas Watkins
 1837 – Thomas Watkins
 1838 – Thomas Prosser
 1839 – Thomas Prosser
 1839 – Thomas Dyke
 1840 – John Leach Nicholas
 1841 – John Leach Nicholas
 1842 – George Willis
 1843 – George Willis
 1844 – James Pearce King
 1845 – James Pearce King
 1852 – John Mayou
 1860 – John Leach Nicholas
 1861 – John Leach Nicholas
 1862 – George Willis M.D. 
 1863 – George Willis M.D. 
 1864 – James Pearce King
 1865 – James Pearce King 
 1870 – Alexander Rolls
 1871 – Alexander Rolls
 1872 – Alexander Rolls
 1873 – Alexander Rolls
 1874 – Thomas Jones Baker
 1875 – Thomas Richard Hyam
 1876 – Thomas Richard Hyam
 1877 – Joseph Coates
 1879 – Arthur Vizard
 1880 – G.P. Tippins 
 1883 – Champney Powell 
 1884 – Champney Powell
 1885 – Champney Powell
 1889 – William Hall
 1891 – William Honeyfield, 1891–96
 1896 – John Rolls, 1st Baron Llangattock
 1896 – Col J.H. Walwyn  
 1898 – Col J.H. Walwyn
 1899-1900 – James Howse
 1900-01 – Hamilton Traherne Baillie
 1901-02 – Hamilton Traherne Baillie (second term)
 1902-03 – Hamilton Traherne Baillie (third term)
 1903 - G. R. Edwards
 1904 - G. R. Edwards
 1906 – Major John Rolls, 2nd Baron Llangattock
 1907 – Major John Rolls, 2nd Baron Llangattock
 1908 – W Sambrook 
 1909 – W Sambrook 
 1914 - W Bunting 
 1910 – W Sambrook 
 1921 – A.T. Blake 
 1934 – Charles James Jones
 1950 – Bernard Partridge
 1951 – Bernard Partridge
 1952 – Bernard Partridge
 1953 – Bernard Partridge
 1954 – Stanley Howard Bowen
 1955 – Stanley Howard Bowen
 1956 – James Benjamin Breakwell
 1957 – James Benjamin Breakwell
 1958 – Richard Pryce Burnet Thomas
 1959 – Richard Pryce Burnet Thomas
 2009 – Terry Christopher
 2010 – Ann Were
 2011 – Jeana Hall
 2012 – Gerry Bright
 2013 – Jeana Hall
 2014 – Jane Gunter
 2015 – Graham Pritchard
 2016 - Terry Christopher
 2017 - Felicity Cotton
 2018 - Terry Christopher
 2019 - Richard Roden
 2020 - Mat Feakins
 2021 - Terry Christopher
 2022- Alice Fletcher

Notes

Politics of the United Kingdom
Ceremonial officers in the United Kingdom
Monmouth, Wales
 
Monmouth